Codringtonia intusplicata is a species of air-breathing land snail, a terrestrial pulmonate gastropod mollusc in the family Helicidae, the typical snails.

Geographic distribution
C. intusplicata is endemic to Greece, where it occurs in the western central part of the country and in the Peloponnese.

References

External links
Images of Codringtonia intusplicata on Flickr

Codringtonia
Molluscs of Europe
Endemic fauna of Greece
Gastropods described in 1851